Breakout: The Singles is the first video compilation by rock band Bon Jovi containing 6 music videos. The videos are of the singles released from the band's first two albums, Bon Jovi and 7800° Fahrenheit.

Track listing
 "In and Out of Love Directed by Martin Kahan"
 "Only Lonely Directed by Jack Cole"
 "Silent Night Directed by Marcello Epstein"
 "She Don't Know Me Directed by Martin Kahan"
 "Runaway Directed by Mike Cuesta"
 "The Hardest Part Is the Night" (live) Directed by Sadao Matsunaga

Available on the following formats
VHS
DVD

Certifications

References 

Bon Jovi video albums
1985 video albums
Music video compilation albums
1985 compilation albums